2021 Indoor Hockey World Cup may refer to:

2021 Men's Indoor Hockey World Cup
2021 Women's Indoor Hockey World Cup